Fernando Kelley Poe, Jr. (May 4, 1943 – May 20, 1995), professionally known as Andy Poe, was a Filipino actor. He was a brother of Philippine action movie king Fernando Poe Jr.

Early life and career
He was born Fernando Kelley Poe Jr. on May 4, 1943, son of Filipino actor Fernando Poe, Sr. and Irish American mestiza wife Elizabeth "Bessie" Kelley. He siblings were Elizabeth ("Liza"), Genevieve, Evangeline, Ronald Allan ("Ronnie") and Freddie; and half-brother of Conrad Poe.

Poe studied at the San Beda College in Mendiola, Manila from his elementary years up to his sophomore high school years. He transferred to the José Rizal College for junior and senior high school. He enrolled at the University of the Philippines to study Architecture. After college, he pursued a career in the movies like his older brother Ronnie. Because his name was used by Ronnie professionally ("Fernando Poe Jr."), he opted to use his nickname "Andy" as his professional name.

Marriage
In 1979, he met 20-year-old, Yvette Christine de Marcaida who was the leading lady of his brother FPJ in "Ang Lihim Ng Guadalupe" which was the entry of FPJ Productions in the 1979 Metro Manila Film Festival. Yvette descended from the Portuguese-Indian Barrettos of the Philippines and distantly related to the Barrettos based in Zambales. Poe and de Marcaida got married in Matinez County, California, on July 31, 1980. They had two sons, Fernando Poe IV ("Donnie") and Alexander Vaughn Poe ("Lex") in 1981 and 1983 respectively.

From 1982 to 1984, Poe and his wife Yvette de Marcaida established DAY FILMS and produced three movies namely: Pamilya Dimagiba, Brando Bandido, and Magtago Ka Na Sa Pinanggalingan Mo. In 1985, Poe and his family immigrated to the United States and resided in Jersey City, New Jersey, until 1993 where the couple became active in the real estate business as realtors with Century 21. Poe returned to the Philippines in 1993 and did several movies until his sudden demise in 1995.

Filmography

Movies
 Bukas, Bibitayin si Itay (1995)
 Gising na ang Higanteng Natutulog (1995) as Delfin Guerrero
 Lagalag: The Eddie Fernandez Story (1994)
 Megamol (1994) as Elias
 Nandito Ako (1993) as Col. Borromeo
 Tumbasan Mo ng Buhay (1993) as Valdez
 Adan Ronquillo: Tubong Cavite, Laking Tondo (1993) as Hepe
 Manila Boy (1993) as Maj. Zaragosa
 Lacson, Batas ng Navotas (1992) as Andy
 Darna at Ding (1980)
 Pepeng Kulisap (1979)
 Isa Para sa Lahat, Lahat Para sa Isa (1979)
 Brothers for Hire (1968)
 Dos por Dos (1968)
 Jingy (1968) as Jingy
 El Niño (1968) as El Niño
 Alamat ng 7 Kilabot (1967)
 Dobol Trobol (1966)
 Magtago Ka na sa Pinangalingan Mo (1965)

Death
Poe died of a heart attack on May 20, 1995, only 2 weeks after his 52nd birthday.

References

External links
 
This is a well known blogspot dedicated to movies specially on Andy Poe
IMDB Andy Poe
Manila Times on Andy Poe and Grace Poe
3rd Par from bottom on Andy Poe
Manila Standard Times on Andy Poe's death

1943 births
1995 deaths
Filipino male film actors
Male actors from Manila
People from Pampanga
Andy
20th-century Filipino male actors
University of the Philippines alumni
Kapampangan people